Jessicah Lee Schipper OAM (born 19 November 1986) is an Australian former competition swimmer. Specialising in the 100 and 200 metres butterfly, she won several gold medals at the Olympic Games and the World Championships between 2004 and 2009.

Early life
In 2003, Jess Schipper finished high school at Pine Rivers State High School.

Swimming career 
Jess Schipper trained at the Redcliffe Leagues Lawnton club in Brisbane, under veteran coach Ken Wood, until the conclusion of the 2008 Summer Olympics. She then trained under the guidance of Stephan Widmar with the Commercial Swimming Club.

Schipper made her debut for Australia at the 2003 World Aquatics Championships in Barcelona, winning the bronze medal as part of the 4×100-metre medley relay team. In 2004, she competed in the 2004 Summer Olympics in Athens, placing 4th in the 100-metre butterfly with the time of 58.22 seconds. She also collected the gold medal in the 4×100-metre medley relay, having swum the butterfly leg in the heats of the event. She was awarded the Order of Australia Medal in January 2005 for service to sport.

At the 2005 World Aquatics Championships in Montreal, she won the silver medal in the 200-metre butterfly with the time of 2:05.65, only 0.04 of a second behind Otylia Jędrzejczak of Poland, who set a new world record in the event. However, the race was overshadowed by the video replay showing that Jędrzejczak touched the finishing wall with only one hand, which is illegal under the butterfly rules.  Doing so allows the swimmer to stretch out further with their single hand. Video replays cannot be used in appeals against race results. Schipper also won the gold in the 100-metre butterfly (57.23) and in the 4×100-metre medley relay, with teammates Sophie Edington, Leisel Jones and Libby Lenton. In doing so, she erased the Australian records in both the 100- and 200-metre butterfly set by Petria Thomas and Susie O'Neill, respectively. 

In 2006 Schipper wiped 0.08 of a second off her 100-metre butterfly time (57.15) Commonwealth record to become the second fastest woman ever in the history of the event, surpassing Martina Moravcová.  At the 2006 Commonwealth Games held in Melbourne she won the gold medal in both the 100- and 200-metre butterfly events, as well as the silver medal in 50-metre butterfly. She combined with Sophie Edington, Leisel Jones and Libby Lenton to set a new world record in the 4×100-metre medley relay, collecting her third gold medal of the meet.

On 17 August 2006, Schipper set a new world record in the women's 200m butterfly, on the opening night of the 2006 Pan Pacific Swimming Championships. Schipper won the final in 2:05.40, bettering the mark of 2:05.61 set by Otylia Jędrzejczak at the 2005 World Aquatics Championships.

Schipper won the gold medal in the 200-metre butterfly at the 2007 World Aquatics Championships in Melbourne, as well as the silver medal in the 100-metre butterfly, behind fellow Australian Libby Lenton.

2008 Summer Olympics 
Schipper qualified for the 100- and 200-metre butterfly events in Beijing.  Schipper won two bronze medals in her individual events at the 2008 Summer Olympics in Beijing, the 100-metre and 200-metre butterfly. Schipper also won gold in the 4×100-metre medley relay team with teammates Leisel Jones, Libby Trickett and Emily Seebohm.

Following the Olympics, Schipper split with her coach Ken Wood. This came after Wood had sold Schipper's training program to Chinese swimmer Liu Zige, who broke Schipper's world record to take the 200-metre title. She then joined the Commercial Swimming Club in Brisbane, under Stephan Widmar, who previously coached her Australian relay teammates Leisel Jones and Trickett.

Schipper maintained her consistency at the world championship level. On day two, she took silver in the 100-metre butterfly, clocking the second fastest time in history. On day five she retained her 200-metre butterfly title in world record time, defeating Liu Zige by 0.49 of a second.

2012 Summer Olympics 

In 2012, Schipper again qualified for the 100- and 200-metre butterfly events. She was eliminated in the heats of the 100 m. She qualified for the semifinal of the 200-metre, but not for the final. Her 200-metre semifinal time of 2:08.21 was nearly 5 seconds slower than her best time in that event.

World & Olympic accomplishments

See also
 List of Australian records in swimming
 List of Commonwealth Games records in swimming
 List of Olympic medalists in swimming (women)
 List of World Aquatics Championships medalists in swimming (women)
 List of Commonwealth Games medallists in swimming (women)
 World record progression 100 metres butterfly
 World record progression 200 metres butterfly

References

External links
 

1986 births
Living people
Australian female freestyle swimmers
Olympic swimmers of Australia
Olympic bronze medalists for Australia
Olympic gold medalists for Australia
Swimmers at the 2004 Summer Olympics
Swimmers at the 2008 Summer Olympics
Swimmers at the 2012 Summer Olympics
Commonwealth Games gold medallists for Australia
Recipients of the Medal of the Order of Australia
World record setters in swimming
Commonwealth Games silver medallists for Australia
Commercial Swimming Club swimmers
Olympic bronze medalists in swimming
Swimmers at the 2006 Commonwealth Games
Swimmers at the 2010 Commonwealth Games
World Aquatics Championships medalists in swimming
Medalists at the FINA World Swimming Championships (25 m)
Medalists at the 2008 Summer Olympics
Swimmers from Brisbane
Medalists at the 2004 Summer Olympics
Olympic gold medalists in swimming
Commonwealth Games medallists in swimming
Medallists at the 2006 Commonwealth Games
Medallists at the 2010 Commonwealth Games